John Browne (born 1 August 1948) is a former Irish Fianna Fáil politician. He was a Teachta Dála (TD) for the Wexford constituency from 1982 to 2016. He is a former Minister of State. His most recent role was as Minister of State with special responsibility for Fisheries at the Department of Agriculture, Fisheries and Food (2007–2008).

Early and private life
John Browne was born in Marshalstown, County Wexford in 1948. He was educated locally at St Mary's Christian Brothers School in Enniscorthy. Browne worked as a salesman and an oil truck driver before becoming involved in politics and also played hurling for the Wexford county team.

Browne is married to Judy and they have three children, a fourth child now deceased. His uncle Seán Browne, was also a TD, who was first elected in 1957. He retired due to ill health. John Browne topped the poll in the constituency of Wexford on a number of occasions.

Political career
Browne first became involved in politics in 1979 when he was elected to Enniscorthy Urban District Council and to Wexford County Council. Browne was first elected to Dáil Éireann at the November 1982 general election for the constituency of Wexford and has been re-elected at every election since.

Over his career Browne has held a number of government and opposition positions.  Not long after his election he was appointed assistant Chief Whip. When Fianna Fáil returned to office in 1987 he remained on the backbenches. When Albert Reynolds became Taoiseach in 1992, he appointed Browne as Minister of State at the Department of Agriculture and Food with special responsibility for the Food Industry. When a new government was formed in January 1993, he was appointed as Minister of State at the Environment with special responsibility for Environmental Protection, serving in that position until 1994.

In 1997, Fianna Fáil returned to office; Browne, however, remained on the backbenches. In 2002 he was appointed as Minister of State at the Department of Communications, Marine and Natural Resources with special responsibility for the Marine. In a 2004 reshuffle, Bertie Ahern appointed Browne as Minister of State at the Department of Agriculture and Food, with special responsibility for Forestry. In a junior ministerial reshuffle in February 2006, Browne was appointed again as Minister of State at the Department of Communications, Marine and Natural Resources with special responsibility for the Marine. Browne has also served as chairman of a number of Oireachtas Committees, including, Agriculture, Marine, Social Affairs, and Finance. After the 2007 general election, he was appointed as Minister of State at the Department of Agriculture, Fisheries and Food with special responsibility for Fisheries, serving in a similar role after a transfer of ministerial functions.

On 13 May 2008, after Brian Cowen became Taoiseach, Browne was not appointed to any ministerial position.

Browne was involved in controversy in November 2011 when it emerged that the Department of Public Expenditure and Reform incorrectly paid him a pension from his time as a junior minister at the Department of Agriculture worth €7,396.31 despite still being a sitting TD. The Department of Public Expenditure and Reform apologised to the TD for the embarrassment caused to him.

Browne retired at the 2016 general election. His son James Browne was elected at that election, and in 2020, was appointed as a Minister of State.

References

External links
John Browne's page on the Fianna Fáil website

 

1948 births
Living people
Fianna Fáil TDs
Irish sportsperson-politicians
Local councillors in County Wexford
Members of the 24th Dáil
Members of the 25th Dáil
Members of the 26th Dáil
Members of the 27th Dáil
Members of the 28th Dáil
Members of the 29th Dáil
Members of the 30th Dáil
Members of the 31st Dáil
Ministers of State of the 26th Dáil
Ministers of State of the 27th Dáil
Ministers of State of the 29th Dáil
Ministers of State of the 30th Dáil
People from Enniscorthy
Wexford inter-county hurlers